Martina Hingis and Sania Mirza were the defending champions, but Mirza chose to compete in Tokyo instead. Hingis played alongside Jelena Janković, but lost in the semifinals to Olga Govortsova and Vera Lapko.

Asia Muhammad and Peng Shuai won the title, defeating Govortsova and Lapko in the final, 6–2, 7–6(7–3).

Seeds

Draw

References 
 Draw

Guangzhou International Women's Open - Doubles
2016 Doubles